Špela Kolbl (born 13 March 1998) is a Slovenian footballer who plays as a forward for ŽNK Mura and the Slovenia women's national team.

Career
Kolbl has been capped for the Slovenia national team, appearing for the team during the 2019 FIFA Women's World Cup qualifying cycle.

References

External links
 Špela Kolbl at NZS 
 
 

1998 births
Living people
Slovenian women's footballers
Slovenia women's international footballers
Women's association football forwards
ŽNK Mura players